John Furla (August 15, 1870 – May 31, 1938) was a Greek-American track and field athlete who competed in the 1904 Summer Olympics. In 1904 he was thirteenth in marathon competition.

Furla, a St. Louis resident who sold fruit at the World's Fair, later owned the city's largest fruit wholesale company.

References

External links
list of American athletes

1870 births
1938 deaths
American male marathon runners
Olympic track and field athletes of the United States
Athletes (track and field) at the 1904 Summer Olympics